Hayley Jensen (born 7 January 1983) is an Australian singer and songwriter who became known after appearing on the second series (2004) of Australian Idol. She was the fourth finalist, leaving the show on 1 November. She spent three years as the lead vocalist of alternative rock band Seasons and dance-rock outfit Silver Cities. Jensen's EP Past Tense and Present Peace was released in February 2017 and reached #1 on the Australian iTunes Country chart followed in 2018 by the album Turning Up the Dial which she toured across Australia, the UK and Canada. Hayley's third studio album Breakin' Hearts was released on 22 October 2021 and came in as the #1 ARIA Country Album and #4 ARIA Australian Albums (all genres).

Early life
Hayley Jensen was born in Albury, New South Wales, but has lived in Canberra for most of her life. Before entering the Australian Idol competition, she studied Jazz vocals at the ANU whilst completing year 11–12, and then went on to study Economics and Management at the University of Canberra.

2004: Early career and Australian Idol

In 2004, Jensen auditioned for Australian Idol. She did not progress from her hometown of Canberra, but travelled to Sydney to try again and was successful.She was selected for a spot in the Final 12 and continued in the competition for a number of weeks, eventually placing 4th.

2005-2013: Post-Idol activities
After Australian Idol, Jensen formed her own record label (White Dove Music), released a solo album, Note to Self and released a number of singles, music videos and toured the country. She performed for Coalition Forces in Iraq, for the Prime Minister on a number of occasions, and at entertainment centres around Australia.

In March 2010, Jensen co-founded alternative pop/rock band Seasons with drummer Peter Wright and guitarist Sam Young. The band released their debut EP A Moment of Clarity on 15 April 2011. In late 2012, Seasons changed their name to Silver Cities, and released their first single, "Lights" was co-credited to Jensen. They toured as a supporting act for Evermore on their Hero National Tour. In November 2013, Hayley and her band received an award for their single "Lights" at the 2013 Australian Independent Music Awards.

2014-2015: The Voice Australia

In 2014, Jensen auditioned for the third season of the Australian version of The Voice. She performed the song "Freefallin" in the episode broadcast on 7 May 2014. Coaches Will.i.am and Kylie Minogue pressed their buttons on time and Jensen chose to join Kylie Minogue's team.

In 2015, Jensen joined Casey Donovan, Doug Williams and Darren Mapes, in a concert celebrating the songs and life of Burt Bacharach.

2016-present: Return to country music
2016 saw Jensen return to country music with her single "The One" released on Friday 15 January. She was nominated as a Toyota Star Maker Finalist at the Tamworth Country Music Festival 2016 where she performed at the Tamworth Town Hall on Sunday 17 January together with 9 other finalists from across Australia. She subsequently released the single "I'll Always Love You" in June 2016 and "Young Years" in December 2016, followed by the EP Past Tense & Present Peace which made it to #1 in the Australian iTunes Country Chart.

Jensen's single "Summertime Soundtrack" was released on 6 November 2017 under the Social Family Records label. She was a finalist in the 2018 Country Music Channel Awards for New Artist of the Year. She released a second single "Saturday Night" from her album Turning Up the Dial on 26 March 2018. Two more singles from the album were released,  "Forever Won't Be Long Enough" and "This Love", both were accompanied by music videos.

At the end of 2018, Jensen was announced as the winner of the Australian Female Artist of The Year award in Planet Country's Music for aNew Generation Awards. She released 2 more singles of her album in 2019, "Next Big Thing" and the title track "Turning Up the Dial".

In 2018, Jensen toured Turning Up the Dial across the south east coast of Australia before heading to Manchester in the UK in 2018 to perform as a headline international act at Buckle & Boots Country Music Festival and to Canada in 2019 to perform at Calgary Stampede (Alberta) & Dauphin's CountryFest (Manitoba).

Early 2020 Jensen released a version of Sarah McLachlan's "Angel", the song which got her to the top 12 in Australian Idol, this time as a duet with Australian Country Artist Beccy Cole. With most of her shows and touring cancelled in 2020 due to COVID-19, Hayley started writing and producing new music with Canadian producer Troy Kokol at Reluctant Cowboy Records. The first new single "Breakin' Hearts" was released in August 2020 as a radio single both in Australia and Canada and made it to number 2 in the Music Networks' Country Hot 50 chart. Following on later in 2020 was the single "Fireworks" co-written with Aussie ex-pat and Billboard Country #1 songwriter, Phil Barton, and writing partner, Dana Heaton-Perdue, with single "Just Gonna Party" released in March 2021.

In July 2021, Jensen released her swampy, soulful single "Karma" and announced the release of her third studio album, "Breakin' Hearts", scheduled for release in October 2021. When released on 22 October 2021 the album Breakin' Hearts shot up in the ARIA charts coming in as #1 ARIA Country Album and #4 ARIA Australian Albums (all genres) for the week of 1 November 2021. Two more singles of the album were released: Better Than That in December 2021 and Shake My Bones in June 2022.

Discography

Albums

Extended plays

Singles

Awards and nominations

Country Music Awards of Australia
The Country Music Awards of Australia is an annual awards night held in January during the Tamworth Country Music Festival. Celebrating recording excellence in the Australian country music industry. They commenced in 1973.
 

! 
|-
| 2018 || Hayley Jensen || New Artist of the Year ||  || 
|-
| 2022 ||   ||   ||  || 
|-
| 2023 || Hayley Jensen  || Female Artist of the Year ||  || | 
|-

References

External links

 Hayley Jensen Official Website

1983 births
Australian Idol participants
People from Albury, New South Wales
People from the Australian Capital Territory
Living people
Australian women pop singers
21st-century Australian singers
21st-century Australian women singers